Andrzej Fonfara (born 4 November 1987) is a Polish former professional boxer who competed from 2006 to 2018, and held the IBO light heavyweight title from 2012 to 2013. He also challenged twice in his career for the WBC light heavyweight title, and once for The Ring light heavyweight belt. He was based in Chicago for most of his career.

Professional career

Super middleweight

Early career 
Andrzej began his career in boxing by joining the Warsaw boxing club Gwardia Warszawa. His trainers were Jacek Kucharczyk and Jerzy Rybicki. After some time he decided to transfer to another Warsaw boxing club, Legia Warszawa, and this time he trained with Krzysztof Kosedowski, Adam Kozlowski and Lukasz Landowski. But he didn't stay there for long and transferred back to his original club. This time he was working with Stanislaw Lakomiec with whom he won his biggest trophies. Finally as a senior he trained with Paweł Skrzecz and Sebastian Skrzecz, and with them he ended his amateur career.

His professional career began in 2006 at Ostrołęka, where he won by majority decision against Czech fighter Miroslav Kubik. After this fight he got a chance to train and fight in the U.S. He currently resides in the U.S. with his family in Chicago and trains with Sam Colonna (Andrzej Golota’s trainer). In 2009 he signed a contract with Dominic Pesoli's 8 Count Productions. That same year, Fonfara tested positive for anabolic steroids. His TKO win over Skyler Thompson was overturned, ending up in a No Contest.

Light heavyweight 
At the beginning of 2010 he decided to move to light heavyweight division which was better suited for his body. In 2010 he won a WBC Youth Championship, and in 2011 WBO NABO Title. On September 23, 2011, he won by TKO in second round against Jose Spearman in his home town of Chicago.

Fonfara vs. Johnson, Karpency 
Fonfara fought 43 year old former world champion Glen Johnson  (51-16-2, 36 KOs) on June 13, 2012, at Chicago's UIC Pavilion. Fonfara defeated Johnson via a controversial unanimous decision with the three judges scoring the bout 99–91, 97-93 and 97–93. Johnson had some success early landing with power shots and jabs when in range, but Fonfara had the better stamina and speed and worked over Johnson, who was fading, for the final four rounds. Fonfara connected well from the distance with jabs, followed by right hands and only allowed Johnson a chance when he chose to fight in close. Johnson announced his retirement after the fight. It was the first time Fonfara had been beyond seven rounds.

Following his first major win against Johnson, Fonfara challenged former world title challenger Tommy Karpency (21-3-1 4 KOs) for the vacant IBO light heavyweight title. The fight took place at the UIC Pavilion on November 16, 2012. In front of 4,224 on a Friday night, Fonfara won the vacant IBO title after stopping Karpency in round 7. Fonfara started off well, until Karpency go in on the action through the middle rounds. In round 7, Karpency slipped and fell on his back, after pleading to the referee to help him up, he eventually got up himself and waved the bout off. Fonfara refused to shake Karpency's hand after the fight. There was bad blood from the beginning of the fight.  At the time of stoppage, Karpency was ahead 57-55 on two of the judges' cards, whilst the third judge had it 57-55 for Fonfara. Karpency was knocked down twice in the 1st-round.

On June 10, 2013, it was announced that Fonfara would next fight against Spanish boxer and former world champion Gabriel "EL Chico Guapo" Campillo. The fight would be shown live on ESPN Friday Night Fights on August 16 at the U.S. Cellular Field in Chicago. The IBO did not sanction the bout and stripped Fonfara of the title. The IBF later sanctioned the fight as an eliminator. Fonfara won the bout via 9th-round knockout. The final blow was a left body shot, which dropped Campillo for the 10 count.

Fonfara vs. Stevenson 
In January 2014, Fonfara notified the IBF, who had ordered him to fight Dmitry Sukhotsky in a final eliminator, that he would pass on the opportunity because he had agreed a deal to fight lineal/WBC/The Ring champion Adonis Stevenson. IBF would instead order Sukhotsky to fight their #3 ranked Cedric Agnew. In February, Stevenson signed a deal with boxing adviser Al Haymon.The fight was scheduled for May 24 on HBO, until HBO cancelled the date from their boxing schedule. On March 25, Michel confirmed the fight would take place on Showtime instead. Stevenson started off very well, dropping his opponent twice with sharp lefts and appeared close to stopping his opponent. Fonfara however, recovered very well, even dropping Stevenson in the ninth round. Stevenson similarly recovered quickly. The two fighters exchanged punches in a good-action final round and the crowd gave the fight a standing ovation. Stevenson won the fight as the judges scored it 116–109, 115-110 & 115–110. CompuBox Stats showed over the 12 rounds, Stevenson landed 329 of 790 punches thrown (42%) and Fonfara landed 217 of his 613  thrown (35%).

After the fight with Stevenson he signed a contract with Al Haymon.

Six months later in November 2014, Fonfara made a comeback at the UIC Pavilion in Chicago against fringe contender Doudou Ngumbu (33-5, 12 KOs). Fonfara went the 10 round distance, winning the fight on the scorecards (97-93, 98-92 and 97-93). The fight averaged 413,000 viewers.

Fonfara vs.  Chávez Jr. 
Fonfara fought Julio César Chávez Jr. on April 18, 2015, at the StubHub Center in Carson, California, for the vacant WBC International Light Heavyweight Championship. A bout in which Fonfara dominated and dropped Chávez with a left hook to the forehead in the 9th round. Before the 10th round begun Chávez told his corner "Stop the fight" making it his first TKO in his career. After fight Chávez said "Yes, I think I won the fight". Some words were lost in translation; he meant to say he felt he was winning the fight at early stages of the bout. Chávez was behind in all three judges score cards at the time of the stoppage.

Fonfara vs. Cleverly 
On October 16, 2015, Fonfara fought former world champion Nathan Cleverly (29-2, 15 KOs) at UIC Pavilion in Chicago for the WBC International light heavyweight title. Fonfara outlasted Cleverly over 12 entertaining rounds to claim a victory by unanimous decision in the main event of a Premier Boxing Champions card. The judges scored it 115–113, 116–112, 116-112 for Fonfara. Combined, Cleverly and Fonfara set CompuBox records for the most combined punches thrown and landed in a light heavyweight fight, throwing 2,524 punches and landing 936, both CompuBox records. Fonfara (28-3, 16 KOs) also set individual records for a light heavyweight by landing 474 punches and attempting 1,413. Despite bleeding from a grotesquely swollen nose over the second half of the fight, Cleverly never stopped coming forward.

Fonfara vs. Smith Jr. 
It was announced that Fonfara would be defending the WBC International light heavyweight title against 26 year old little-known Joe Smith Jr. (21-1, 17 KOs) at the UIC Pavilion in Chicago, Illinois, on June 18, 2016, in a scheduled 10 round fight in the main event of the Premier Boxing Champions card on NBC.

In an 'Upset of the Year' in the light heavyweight division, Smith won the title by defeating Fonfara via a 1st-round technical knockout. Smith knocked Fonfara down twice in the round 1. The fight was halted after the second knockdown by referee Hector Afu. The official time of the stoppage was at 2:32. Smith caught Fonfara with a big right hand that dropped him. Fonfara got back to his feet. The referee let the fight continue. When the action resumed, Smith landed a left hook that snapped Fonfara's head back. Smith then followed up with a hard right hand to the head that dropped Fonfara in the corner, which ended the fight. The win also ended Fonfara's 15 fight undefeated streak at the UIC Pavilion. Smith went on to defeat former two weight world champion Bernard Hopkins via stoppage in December 2017.

Fonfara vs. Dawson 
On February 7, 2017, ESPN revealed that Fonfara would return to the ring on March 4 on the undercard of the Danny Garcia vs. Keith Thurman welterweight unification fight at the Barclays Center in New York. He was scheduled to fight in a 10-round fight against 34 year old, former world champion Chad Dawson (34-4, 19 KOs), who last fought in April 2016 and having lost 3 of his last 6 fights. Fonfara started training with Virgil Hunter before the fight. Going into the tenth and final round, it was reported that Fonfara was behind on the scorecards. 38 seconds into the round, he landed a straight right to Dawson, which shook him, followed by a combination, which forced the referee to stop the fight and claim the much needed win. Dawson was also knocked down in the beginning on round 9, but got back up, beat the count and finished the round. Dawson considered retirement after this fight.

Fonfara vs. Stevenson II 
On 8 April 2017, Adonis Stevenson revealed on social media that he had finalised a deal to fight Fonfara in a rematch from their first fight in 2014. Yvon Michel later told ESPN that the fight was official and take place in Canada, in the province of Quebec on June 3, 2017  Fonfara started the fight well in round 1, connecting with the jab. Stevenson, who was patient with his left hand, eventually landed a left hook to the head of Fonfara, dropping him to the canvas. Fonfara beat the count, but was on steady legs and when he got backed up to in the corner, the bell saved him from an onslaught. Round 2 opened with Stevenson carrying on where he left of, pummeling Fonfara with huge lefts. The fight came to an abrupt end, when Fonfara's trainer, Virgil Hunter stepped up on the apron after just 28 seconds, motioning to the referee to stop the bout, which referee Michael Griffin did. Stevenson retained his WBC and Lineal world titles. Fonfara agreed with the stoppage and Hunter explained in the post fight interview, “There was no need to continue. He was hurt in the first round. He survived, but even when he came back to the corner he wasn’t all the way there. I told him in the second round, ‘Don’t even throw a punch. Just defend until you get yourself back.’ These things happen. I thought he was doing quite well until he fell in and got caught with a punch.”

Cruiserweight

Fonfara vs. Sillakh 
On April 23, 2018, it was reported that Fonfara would return to fight in Poland for the first time since his first professional fight in 2006 at the Hala Torwar in Warsaw on June 16 against former light heavyweight world title challenger Ismail Sillakh (25-5, 19 KOs) at the cruiserweight limit. Going into the fight, Sillakh was 1-3 in his previous four fights. Fonfara defeated Sillakh via sixth-round technical knockout in a scheduled 10 round fight. The ending came when Fonfara unloaded with a flurry of shots that led referee Leszek Jankowiak to stop the fight. The official time was 2 minutes, 14 seconds. Sillakh was also dropped in round 2, however managed to beat the count. At the time of the stoppage, Fonfara was up on the scorecards 49-45, 49-45 and 47-47.

Retirement 
On January 24, 2019, PBC announced Fonfara would fight Edwin Rodríguez (30-2, 20 KOs) on the Shawn Porter vs. Yordenis Ugas undercard on March 9 at the Dignity Health Sports Park in Carson, California. The card was to be televised on FOX and FOX Deportes.

On February 13, 2019, Fonfara announced his retirement from boxing at the age of 31. In a statement to fans, he wrote:

Fonfara ended his 13 year professional career with 30 wins, 18 coming inside the distance and 5 losses.

Professional boxing record

References

External links

Andrzej Fonfara - Profile, News Archive & Current Rankings at Box.Live

1987 births
Living people
People from Radom
Sportspeople from Masovian Voivodeship
Polish male boxers
Doping cases in boxing
Polish sportspeople in doping cases
International Boxing Organization champions
Light-heavyweight boxers
Super-middleweight boxers